The Xechasmeni railway station is the railway station that serves the nearby village of Xechasmeni in Central Macedonia, Greece. The station is located just west of the settlement, on the Thessaloniki–Bitola railway, and is severed by both Local and Proastiakos Services.

History
Opened in 1894 in what was then the Ottoman Empire, at the completion of the Société du Chemin de Fer ottoman Salonique-Monastir, a branchline of the Chemins de fer Orientaux from Thessaloniki to Bitola. During this period Northern Greece and the southern Balkans were still under Ottoman rule, and Adendro was known as Kirtzilar. Adendro was annexed by Greece on 18 October 1912 during the First Balkan War. On 17 October 1925, The Greek government purchased the Greek sections of the former Salonica Monastir railway and the railway became part of the Hellenic State Railways, with the remaining section north of Florina seeded to Yugoslavia. In 1970 OSE became the legal successor to the SEK, taking over responsibilities for most of Greece's rail infrastructure. On 1 January 1971, the station, and most of Greek rail infrastructure was transferred to the Hellenic Railways Organisation S.A., a state-owned corporation. Freight traffic declined sharply when the state-imposed monopoly of OSE for the transport of agricultural products and fertilisers ended in the early 1990s. Many small stations of the network with little passenger traffic were closed down. On 9 September 2007, the station reopened. Since 2007, the station is served by the Proastiakos Thessaloniki services to New Railway Station. In 2009, with the Greek debt crisis unfolding OSE's Management was forced to reduce services across the network. Timetables were cut back and routes closed as the government-run entity attempted to reduce overheads. In 2017 OSE's passenger transport sector was privatised as TrainOSE, currently, a wholly owned subsidiary of Ferrovie dello Stato Italiane infrastructure, including stations, remained under the control of OSE.

Facilities
The station is still housed in the original 19th-century brick-built station building. However, buildings are rundown and almost abandoned. As of (2020) the station is unstaffed, with no staffed booking office or waiting rooms. There is no footbridge over the lines, though passengers can walk across the rails, it is, however not wheelchair accessible. The station is only equipped with only bus ‘like’ shelter on a single short platform, with no digital display screens or timetable poster boards. The station has no toilet facilities. As a result, the station is currently little more than an unstaffed halt. However, infrequent buses do call at the station.

Services
As of 2020, the station is served on a daily basis by three InterCity trains between Thessaloniki and Florina and 18 Prostiakos terminating at Edessa. There are no Services to Bitola as the short international connection is now disused, with all international traffic being routed via Idomeni and Gevgelija.

Station Layout

External links
Οργανισμός Σιδηροδρόμων Ελλάδος (ΟΣΕ) - GTP

References

Railway stations in Central Macedonia
Railway stations opened in 1894
Buildings and structures in Imathia